This is a list of the members of the Dewan Rakyat (House of Representatives) of the 11th Parliament of Malaysia, elected in 2004.

Composition

Election pendulum 
The 11th General Election witnessed 198 governmental seats and 21 non-governmental seats filled the Dewan Rakyat. The government side has 134 safe seats and 22 fairly safe seats, while the other side has 3 safe seats and 4 fairly safe seats. In addition, 17 seats was win uncontested in governmental seats.

Seating arrangement
This is the seating arrangement as of its last meeting on 19 December 2007. None of any seats is labelled as Vacant.

Elected members by state


Unless noted otherwise, the MPs served the entire term of the parliament (from 17 May 2004 until 13 February 2008).

Perlis

Kedah

Kelantan

Terengganu

Penang

Perak

Pahang

Selangor

Federal Territory of Kuala Lumpur

Federal Territory of Putrajaya

Negeri Sembilan

Malacca

Johor

Federal Territory of Labuan

Sabah

Sarawak

Notes

References 

Malaysian parliaments
Lists of members of the Dewan Rakyat